Raymond Abracosa (born December 2, 1990), better known as Abra, is a Filipino rapper, hip hop recording artist and occasional actor. He gained mainstream popularity with his song "Gayuma". When the video reached more than 26 million views on YouTube, it was hailed as the highest number generated by any local artist. Before that, he is a well-known battle emcee in the FlipTop Battle League.

Career
His career started as a member of Pinoy hip hop group Lyrically Deranged Poets (LDP) in 2010. He joined the FlipTop Battle League as Abra. They released their independent debut album The Project in 2009 and had their first major concert at the legendary Music Museum in 2010. LDP was awarded Best Urban Group at both the 2010 and 2011 Urban Music Awards, among other nominations. In 2011, LDP was granted TV air time on myx for the music video of their song "Here to Own It", which was able to enter the charts. He is also a major icon in the Fliptop battle league as well as a co-host on PTV 4's show iConnect.

When the FlipTop Battle League and Sunugan rap battle leagues started out in 2010, Abra was one of the first battle emcees to compete and gradually make a name for himself. After a couple of intense rap battles, Abra has been considered one of the heavyweights in Filipino rap battling. Using his compelling lyrical style coupled with witty antics, he is able to impress viewers and artists alike; and has YouTube videos that have amassed millions of views. It did not take long until Abra was able to perform on live television, radio shows and various events across the country.

In 2013, Abra and his label Artifice Records signed a major distribution deal with Ivory Music & Video. He released his self-titled debut album nationwide on February 21, 2014. He took home the 'Best Music on YouTube Award' for his YouTube Channel called 'Abra TV' at the 2013 Globe Tatt Awards. On March 29, he collaborated with Maja Salvador for the song "Halika Na" on her debut album Believe.

The music video for his single "Cerberus", featuring Loonie and Ron Henley under the direction of Willan Rivera, won the Best Music Video Award at the Myx Music Awards 2016.

Discography

Albums
Abra – self-titled album (released nationwide February 21, 2014)

Group albums
The Project (with Lyrically Deranged Poets) (2009)

Extended plays
Hendrix EP (2018)

Compilation albums
Various Artists: Homegrown Hiphop (Universal Music Group, 2013)
Various Artists: Juan dela Cruz: The Official Soundtrack (Star Records, 2013)

Singles
"Abrakadabra"
"Gayuma" (featuring Thyro Alfaro and Jeriko Aguilar) (2012)
"Alab ng Puso" (theme of Juan dela Cruz)
"Ilusyon" (featuring Arci Muñoz) (2013)
"Midas" (featuring Jaq Dionisio) (2013)
"Bolang Kristal" (featuring KZ Tandingan)
"Cerberus" (featuring Loonie and Ron Henley) (2014)
"Diwata" (featuring Chito Miranda) (2014)
"Sanib Pwersa" (featuring Raimund Marasigan) (2014)
"Dedma" (featuring Julie Anne San Jose) (2014)
"'King Inang Bayan" (featuring Reese Lansangan) (2016)
"'Apoy" (featuring Shanti Dope) (2018)

As featured artist
"Isang Jeep" - Loonie (with Hiphop22)
"Halika Na" – Maja Salvador
"Mine" – Pow Chaves
"Tanyag" – Loonie
"Halik sa Hangin" – Ebe Dancel
"Gurl" – Father
"Peque"- Apekz (with Mikerapphone)

Television and media appearances

Television
The Voice of the Philippines (season 2) (ABS-CBN, guest performer)
ASAP (ABS-CBN, guest)
It's Showtime (ABS-CBN, guest judge / performer)
Kris TV (ABS-CBN, guest)
Gandang Gabi, Vice! (ABS-CBN, guest)
Sarah G. Live (ABS-CBN, guest)
Rated K (ABS-CBN, guest)
Showbiz Inside Report (ABS-CBN, guest)
Kapamilya, Deal or No Deal (ABS-CBN, guest player)
Minute to Win It (ABS-CBN, guest player)
Pilipinas Got Talent (ABS-CBN, guest)
Banana Split: Ihaw Na! (ABS-CBN, guest)
Bandila: Ikaw Na! (ABS-CBN, guest)
Wowowillie (TV5, 2013)
iConnect (PTV 4, 2012–present)
Sharon: Kasama Mo, Kapatid (TV5, guest)
Party Pilipinas (GMA, guest)
H.O.T. TV: Hindi Ordinaryong Tsismis (GMA, guest)
Celebrity Bluff (GMA, guest player)
Kapuso Mo, Jessica Soho (GMA, guest)
The Ryzza Mae Show (GMA, guest)
Flashbook (GMA News TV, guest)
Front Row (GMA, guest)
Aquino & Abunda Tonight (ABS-CBN, guest)
Buzz ng Bayan (ABS-CBN, guest)
Tunay Na Buhay (GMA, guest)

Film
Boy Pick-Up: The Movie, as fictional version of himself (cameo)
Kubot: The Aswang Chronicles, as Benjie
Respeto, as Hendrix

Music videos
"Gayuma" (feat. Thyro Alfaro & Jeriko Aguilar; September 2012)
"Abrakadabra"
"Ilusyon" (feat. Arci Muñoz; July 2013)
"Alab ng Puso" (Juan dela Cruz OST)
"Rejoice Haba ng Hair" (for Rejoice commercial)
"Rejoice Ikaw na ang Malupit" (for Rejoice commercial)
"WonderfulXmasTime"
"Midas" (feat. Jaq Dionisio – Boy Golden OST)
"Sanib Puwersa" (feat. Raimund Marasigan, for Colt 45 commercial)
"Dedma" (feat. Julie Anne San Jose; October 2014)
"Diwata" (feat. Chito Miranda; December 2014)
"Cerberus" (feat. Ron Henley & Loonie; September 2015)
"Bolang Kristal" (feat. KZ Tandingan; March 2016)
"Peque" (by Apekz, with Mikerapphone;  Jan 13, 2018)

Awards and nominations

References

External links

 
Official page on Twitter
Channel on YouTube

1990 births
Living people
Filipino hip hop musicians
21st-century Filipino male singers
Filipino rappers
Filipino singer-songwriters
Male actors from Metro Manila
People from Metro Manila
People from Pasig
Tagalog people
University of Asia and the Pacific alumni
21st-century Filipino male actors